Budeč or Budec may refer to:

People
Budec, Župan of Bribir, count of Bribir, Croatia in the 11th century

Places in the Czech Republic
Budeč (Jindřichův Hradec District), a municipality and village in the South Bohemian Region
Budeč (Žďár nad Sázavou District), a municipality and village in the Vysočina Region
Budeč (Kladno District), an early medieval settlement in Central Bohemia
Budeč, a village and part of Hněvkovice in the Vysočina Region
Budeč, a village and part of Úněšov in the Plzeň Region